Didmarton is a village and civil parish in Gloucestershire, England. The parish is on the county borders with South Gloucestershire (to the southwest) and Wiltshire (to the south and southeast).

Since 25 March 1883, the civil parish has included the former parish of Oldbury-on-the-Hill.

History

A military survey of Didmarton in 1522 shows that it was then a very small village, overshadowed by the neighbouring Oldbury-on-the-Hill.

In the 16th century, the manor of Didmarton was owned by the Seacole family. In 1571, Simon Codrington married Agnes, daughter and co-heiress of Richard Seacole, and the estate thus passed to their son Robert Codrington. It was sold to Charles Somerset, 4th Duke of Beaufort, in about 1750, but has had a succession of other owners since then.

Together with Oldbury, the parish was subject to enclosure in 1829.

According to The National Gazetteer of Great Britain and Ireland (1868):

Places of worship
St Laurence's church at Didmarton (Church of England) is an early English building with a later open bell tower, unusual in England. Archaeological work has suggested an origin in the 12th century. The church's dedication is to St Laurence of Canterbury, whose feast day is on 3 February.

The village's Congregational church is a square stone building with arched sash windows.

Another Anglican church at the western end of the village, once dedicated to St Michael and All Angels, has been converted to a private house, although its churchyard is still consecrated ground.

Public houses
The village's present-day pub, the King's Arms, was first mentioned in 1772. The former George Inn dated from at least 1791, and the former Compasses Inn (or Three Compasses) from 1798.

Local names
Parish registers from 1674 to 1991 are held at the Gloucestershire Record Office.

Surnames in the marriages register for 1675 to 1751 are: Acton, Allen, Biggs, Bishop, Brooks, Brush, Burcombe, Byrton, Carey, Chapman, Chappel(l), Codrington, Collings, Davies, Drew, Emely, Frith, Gingill, Harris, Hatchett, Heaven, Iddols, Kingscott, Lewis, Milsum, Minchin, Porter, Powel, Power, Robbins, Scrope, Shipton, Smart, Sparkes, Taunton, Thompson, Walls, Watts, Weekes, White, and Witchell.

The surnames recorded in the parish graveyard, and in that of the Didmarton Congregational church, include: Baker, Bickerton, Borham, Cox, Gould, Hatherell, Inane, Lucas, Pritchard, Short, Rice, Robbins, Till, and Tuck.

Notes

External links

Didmarton at genuki.org.uk
Didmarton location map from google.co.uk/maps
Didmarton, Lasborough, Leighterton, Boxwell, Oldbury-on-the-Hill & Saddlewood page at rootsweb.ancestry.com, with photograph of St Lawrence's Church, Didmarton
Gloucestershire census returns 1801-1901 at genuki.org.uk
Video report of the nearby Leighterton School by BizView.tv

Villages in Gloucestershire
Cotswold District